Gordon Hunt may refer to:

 Gordon Hunt (musician), British oboist
 Gordon Hunt (director) (1929–2016), American actor and director